Sungin Hall (Hangul: 숭인전, Hanja: 崇仁殿) built in 1325 is one of the earliest shrines located at Chongno-dong, Chung-guyok, Pyongyang, North Korea. It has been registered as No.4 National Treasure of North Korea. The hall faces Sungnyong Hall of Pyongyang students' palace. 

Originally, the hall included 10 another wings including annexes, grand gates (in each directions) and quarters. During Korean War, several annexes were demolished yet quarter and grate gate were restored, which was finally moved to the current site.

Built during Goryeo Dynasty, the hall shows the characteristics of architectural style during 14th century of Korea. A gable roof was decorated with beautiful dancheong, multicolored paintwork on wooden building. It is a notable feature that pillars in the corner comes forward compared to those in center, with a view to hold the stability of the building.

Buildings and structures in Pyongyang
National Treasures of North Korea
Archaeological sites in North Korea
Goryeo
Buildings and structures completed in 1325
1325 establishments in Asia